Arbnež (Albanian: Arbënesh), also known as Arbneš, is a village in the Bar municipality in southern Montenegro. It is located in the Skadarska Krajina region, by Lake Skadar.

Demographics
According to the 2011 census, its population was 327.

References

Populated places in Bar Municipality
Albanian communities in Montenegro